Monika Gollner (born 23 October 1974 in Velden) is a retired Austrian high jumper.

She finished thirteenth at the 1992 World Junior Championships, and also competed at the 1995 World Indoor Championships, the 1995 World Championships, the 1998 European Championships and the 2012 European Championships without reaching the final.

References

1974 births
Living people
Austrian female high jumpers
People from Villach-Land
Sportspeople from Carinthia (state)